Chris Clarke (born October 24, 1956 in Halifax, Nova Scotia) is a retired boxer from Canada, who won the gold medal in the men's lightweight division at the 1975 Pan American Games. A year later he represented his native country at the 1976 Summer Olympics, where he was defeated in the second round.

In 2006, Chris Clarke was inducted into the Nova Scotia Sports Hall Of Fame.

1976 Olympic results
Below are the results of Chris Clarke, a light welterweight boxer from Canada who competed at the 1976 Montreal Olympics:

 Round of 64: bye
 Round of 32: defeated Lasse Friman (Finland) on points, 5-0
 Round of 16: lost to Jozsef Nagy (Hungary) referee stopped contest in the third round

References
 Profile

1956 births
Living people
Canadian people of British descent
Boxers at the 1976 Summer Olympics
Olympic boxers of Canada
Boxers at the 1975 Pan American Games
Pan American Games gold medalists for Canada
Sportspeople from Halifax, Nova Scotia
Canadian male boxers
Pan American Games medalists in boxing
Lightweight boxers
Medalists at the 1975 Pan American Games